The governor of Pskov Oblast is the highest official of Pskov Oblast, a federal subject of Russia. The governor heads the executive branch in the region.

History of office 
On 15 November 1991, by the decree of president Boris Yeltsin, the director of Pskovnefteprodukt enterprise Anatoly Dobryakov was appointed Head of Administration of Pskov Oblast. In May 1992, Dobryakov was removed from office after being accused of involvement in illegal selling of fuel and non-ferrous metals to the Baltic states. Deputy mayor of Pskov for economic reforms Vladislav Tumanov was appointed instead. In October 1996 he lost the election to Yevgeny Mikhailov, who became the first Liberal Democrat elected governor in Russia. The 2000 election was the only one to use the first-past-the-post system. On 1 January 2006 the office of the Head of Administration was renamed into Governor of Pskov Oblast.

List of officeholders

References 

Politics of Pskov Oblast
 
Pskov